Dev Kanya is a Bollywood film. It was released in 1963.

Music
"Mata O Mata Jeevan Ki Data" - Asha Bhosle
"Pag Ghungharoo Bole Chhananan Chhum" - Asha Bhosle, Mahendra Kapoor
"Saiyan Chhod De Mera Haath, Haye Dhadke Jiya, Kaise Chhod Du" - Asha Bhosle, Mohammed Rafi
"Zara Pehchano Toh Main Kaun, Kaha Se Aaye" - Asha Bhosle, Mukesh
"Bole Jhan Jhan Jhan Payal Bole" - Asha Bhosle
"O Sansar Banane Wale" - Asha Bhosle
"Piyaa-Milan Ko Jaane Waali Sambhal-Sambhal Kar Chal" - Amirbai Karnataki

References

External links
 

1963 films
1960s Hindi-language films